Williams Landing railway station is located on the Werribee line in Victoria, Australia. It serves the western Melbourne suburb of Williams Landing, and opened on 28 April 2013.

The Western standard gauge line passes to the north of Platform 1.

History
In 2008, the State Government announced the station in the Victorian Transport Plan. Construction was originally intended to commence during 2010, but eventually started in September 2011, with the station opening on 28 April 2013. Construction of the station required the slewing of the existing southern track to make room for the new island platform.

The cost of the station in 2011 was budgeted at $86 million for the station and $24 million for associated road works, including a road bridge over the line. The cost was criticised by the Public Transport Users Association as being too high.

Like the suburb itself, the station was named after the nearby RAAF Williams base, itself named after Sir Richard Williams, an RAAF Chief of Air Force, and the Director General of Civil Aviation between 1946-1955.

Platforms and services
Williams Landing has one island platform with two faces. It is served by Werribee line trains.

Platform 1:
  all stations and limited express services to Flinders Street and Frankston

Platform 2:
  all stations services to Werribee

Transport links
CDC Melbourne operates seven routes to and from Williams Landing station, under contract to Public Transport Victoria:
 : to Tarneit station
 : to Tarneit station
 : to Tarneit station
 : to Werribee station
 : to Point Cook South
 : to Point Cook South
 : to Saltwater Coast Estate (Point Cook)

Transit Systems Victoria operates one route to and from Williams Landing station, under contract to Public Transport Victoria:
  : to Altona Meadows (Saturday and Sunday mornings only)

Gallery

References

External links

Premium Melbourne railway stations
Railway stations in Melbourne
Railway stations in Australia opened in 2013
Railway stations in the City of Wyndham